Piz Sarsura is a mountain of the Albula Alps, located east of Piz Vadret in Graubünden, Switzerland. It overlooks two glaciers: the Vadret da Grialetsch on its north-west side and the Vadret da Sarsura on its north-east side. The closest mountain hut is the Chamanna da Grialetsch, on the north side.

References

External links
 Piz Sarsura on Hikr
 Piz Sarsura on Summitpost

Mountains of Graubünden
Mountains of the Alps
Alpine three-thousanders
Mountains of Switzerland
Zernez